The 1988 Sonoma State Cossacks football team represented Sonoma State University as a member of the Northern California Athletic Conference (NCAC) during the 1988 NCAA Division II football season. Led by Marty Fine in his second and final season as head coach, Sonoma State compiled an overall record of 5–5 with a mark of 3–2 in conference play, tying for second place in the NCAC. The team was outscored by its opponents 225 to 200 for the season. The Cossacks played home games at Cossacks Stadium in Rohnert Park, California.

Fine finished his tenure as at Sonoma State with an overall record of 10–11, for a .476 winning percentage.

Schedule

Notes

References

Sonoma State
Sonoma State Cossacks football seasons
Sonoma State Cossacks football